Gellimanwydd Chapel, also known as the Christian Temple, is an Independent (Congregationalist) chapel in Ammanford, Carmarthenshire, Wales. Services at Gellimanwydd are conducted in the Welsh language.

The chapel was founded in the eighteenth century and is the oldest of the town's chapels. 

The name Christian Temple was adopted in the 1870s by a minister convinced that the Welsh language would die out.

The politician Jim Griffiths and his wife are buried at Gellimanwydd.

References

External links

Chapels in Carmarthenshire